Perumannu is a village near Iritty in Kannur district of Kerala, India.

2008 accident
On 4 December 2008, nine schoolchildren were killed and twelve injured in a road accident at Perumannu, when a Jeep hit the children as they were on their way home from school.
One of the injured victims died a few days later, raising the death toll to 10 children.

Transportation
The national highway passes through Taliparamba town. Mangalore and Mumbai can be accessed on the northern side and Cochin and Thiruvananthapuram can be accessed on the southern side. The road to the east connects to Mysore and Bangalore.  The nearest railway station is Kannur on Mangalore-Palakkad line. There are airports at Mangalore and Calicut.

References

Villages near Irikkur